Imbewu: The Seed is a South African television drama series created by Duma Ndlovu and executive producers Anant Singh and Leleti Khumalo. The series is an e.tv original production produced by Grapevine Productions (a co-production between Word of Mouth Productions, Videovision Entertainment and Luyks Productions) commissioned and distributed by e.tv.

Imbewu season 5 stars Thembi Mtshali-Jones, Leleti Khumalo, Lusanda Mbane, Sandile Dlamini, Kay Sibiya, Nqobile Ndlovu, Nokubonga Khuzwayo, Raphael Griffiths, Jailoshini Naidoo, Kajal Maharaj and Jack Devnarai featuring/Co-Starring Vuyokazi Tshona, Vuyiseka Cawe, Busisiwe Shezi, Anathi Gobeni, Nduduzo Zuma, Kaylin Soobraminia, Mandisa Vilakazi, Sindisiwe Zondo, Sinenhlanhla Sabela, Zamaswazi Mokoena, Thando Gcwensa, Ntokozo Mzulwini and Mduduzi Ntombela

As of August 5, 2021, the show moved to eVOD.
As of January 2023 , the e.tv telenovela has been cancelled and will air its final episode in the first quarter of April 2023.

Plot
Zimele "Ngcolosi" Bhengu (Tony Kgoroge) is a business mogul who lives in Durban with his wife, Nokubonga Mazulu Bhengu (Leleti Khumalo) and his four children Nganono, Zithulele, Zakhiti and Buhle. Ngcolosi later discovers he has another son, Nkululeko who has been working in his company as a security guard. 

His brother Phakade is a pastor and lives in south Durban on his farm with his wife, KaMadonsela and his children, Ntombifuthi and Nokhukhanya. MaNdlovu is the matriarch of the Bhengu family and will do anything to keep her family together. 

Zimele built his company, Maluju Oil, with his friend Pranav Rampersad. Pranav is the patriarch of the Rampersad family with his wife, Nirupa and his children Shria and Mira Rampersad. 

A secret dating back more than 25 years ago threatens to break the Bhengu family. Ngcolosi and Pranav die later. Nkululeko is Ngcolosi's only biological son and inherited his estate, company share and CEO position. Nkulukeko and the Bhengus become rivals. Nkuleleko's mother Thokozile, turns him against the Bhengus.

It is revealed that Ka Madonsela,who has also some sort of rivalry with Ma Zulu,had worked together with Thokozile to destroy Ma Zulu but Ncgolosi was killed by accident. After Ka Madonsela tells this to her husband, she pleads him to not get her arrested. 

Nkuleleko falls for Zethu, much to her father Phunyuka's disapproval. They later marry and get pregnant. Nkuleleko cheats on her with Fikile. After their son Mepho is born, Zethu rejects Nkuleleko and leaves him with her son. 

Meanwhile, the relationship between the Bhengus and Rampesards changes as both families want to own Maluju Oil. Pranav's family plots to steal the company from the Bhengu's family. Mazulu becomes the new CEO. 

Ma Zulu is with Menzi, who hides a dark secret from her. Buhle dates a man who is planning to destroy the Bhengu's.As Thokozile escapes jail with other female prisoners, she tries to kill Ka Madonsela but is killed by Nokhukhanya. Fikile is soon revealed to be Ngcolosi's daughter but goes missing after hearing the news. Mira posions her mother and faked a pregnancy and faked a baby's death and Nomusa fakes her CvlV to get a job at maluju oil Nkuleleko gets a video of Zithulele throwing his number plate in the dam.

Cast Shown on Opening Scene
Season 1
Leleti Khumalo - Mazulu
Mpumelelo Bhulose (replaced) - Ngcolosi 
Tony Kgoroge - Ngcolosi
Thembi Mtshali-Jones - Mandlovu
Kobeshan Naidoo-Pranav
Jailoshini Naidoo-Nirupa
Sandile Dlamini- Phakade Bhengu
Fundiswa Zwane - Kamadonsela
Season 2
Leleti Khumalo - Mazulu
Tony Kgoroge-Ngcolosi
Thembi Mtshali-Jones - Mandlovu
Sandile Dlamini - Phakade Bhengu
Kobeshan Naidoo-Pranav
Jailoshini Naidoo-Nirupa
Fundiswa Zwane-Kamadonsela
Season 3
Thembi Mtshali-Jones - Mandlovu Bhengu
Leleti Khumalo- Mazulu
Tony Kgoroge-Ngcolosi
Sandile Dlamini - Phakade
Fundiswa Zwane-Kamadonsela
Kobeshan Naidoo-Pranav
Jailoshini Naidoo-Nirupa
Raphael Griffiths-Zithulele
Nokubonga Khuzwayo-Zakithi
Kajal Maharaj-Shria
Season 4
Thembi Mtshali-Jones - Mandlovu
Leleti Khumalo- Mazulu
Muzi Mthabela Menzi
Sandile Dlamini- Phakade
Brenda Mhlongo-Kamadonsela
Jailoshini Naidoo-Nirupa
Raphael Griffiths-Zithulele
Nokubonga Khuzwayo-Zakithi
Kajal Maharaj-Shria
Nkanyiso Mchunu-Nkululeko
Season 5
Thembi Mtshali-Jones-Mandlovu
Leleti Khumalo-Mazuli
Lusanda Mbane-Makhosazana
Sandile Dlamini-Phakade
Nqobile Ndlovu-Khanyo
Kay Sibiya-Nkululeko
Nokubonga Khuzwayo-Zakithi
Raphael Griffiths-Zithulele
Jailoshini Naidoo-Nirupa
Kajal Maharaj-Shria
Jack Devnarai-Maharaj

Characters
Thembi Mtshali-Jones As MaNdlovu Bhengu. She is matriarch of the Bhengu family and she is mother of Shongololo and Ngcolosi , mother in law of MaZulu and KaMadonsela(deceased) , grandmother of Nkululeko, Fikile, Nganono(deceased), Zakithi, Nokukhanya, Ntombifuthi, Zithulele and Buhle, great-grandmother of Mepho and Nozimangaliso. She is very stubborn and she would do anything to keep her family together and respected. Nkululeko(only Ngcolosi's biological son) is her favorite grandchild and she supports him in whatever he is doing. She forced Shongololo and MaZulu(Ngcolosi's wife) to sleep together and make children for Ngcolosi believing that he is infertile. (Season 1 - Present)

Leleti Khumalo As Nokubonga "MaZulu" Bhengu. She is a widow of a youngest son of Bhengu family, Ngcolosi(deceased), mother of Nganono, Zakithi, Zithulele and Buhle, sister in law of Shongololo and KaMadonsela, aunt of Nokukhanya and Ntombifuthi and she is Nirupa Rampersad's friend and she had an affair with her brother in law Shongololo. After Ngcolosi was killed Nkululeko get all the inheritance, shares and CEO position of Maluju oil. MaZulu and her children were not happy with that, MaZulu became a CEO of Maluju Oil after she fights Nkululeko and convince the Bord of Maluju Oil to vote for her as a CEO. She felt in love with Menzi Vilakazi and they get engaged, but MaZulu refused to marry Menzi. She was in the feud with Nirupa because she dated Menzi. She knows who killed Menzi and where he was buried. 

Lusanda Mbane As Makhosazane, she work at Maluju Oil as a company lawyer, she dated, Menzi and Nkululeko. She tortured and buried Menzi alive, she sent someone to burn Shongololo's church, She works with Maharaj. 

Sandile Dlamini As Phakade "Shongololo" Bhengu. He is patriarch of the Bhengu family, a pastor, MaNdlovu's elder son, KaMadonsela's widower, Ngcolosi's elder brother, a father of Nokukhanya Bhengu and Ntombifuthi Bhengu and he is biological father of MaZulu's children and He is Thu Sheleni's uncle. He live in his farm with his wife, and two kids, he is a honorable and respected man in his community. He and Ngcolosi have been fighting most of the time.

Nqobile Ndlovu As Nokukhanya "Khanyo" Bhengu, she is a daughter of Shongololo and KaMadonsela(deceased),a granddaughter of MaNdlovu, a sister of Ntombifuthi Bhengu, a niece of Ngcolosi and MaZulu, cousin of Nkululeko, Nganono, Zakithi, zithulele, Buhle and a pastor of his father's church. She is stubborn as MaNdlovu. She killed Thokozile while Thokozile tried to kill her mother. 

Kay Sibiya As Nkululeko Bhengu, He is a former Soldier, former head of security of Maluju Oil, former CEO of Maluju Oil, a only biological son of Ngcolosi(deceased) and Thokozile(deceased) ,a father of Mepho and Nozimangaliso, a stepson of MaZulu, grandson of MaNdlovu, elder brother of Nganono, Zakithi, Zithulele and Buhle, a cousin of Nokukhanya and Ntombifuthi, nephew of Shongololo and KaMadonsela. He was a revival of the Bhengu family after Ngcolosi gave him all inheritance, he helped her mother to fake her death and escape the country. He dated Zakithi before they both found out that they are siblings, he have a son with Zethu Khanyile(Nganono's ex) and a daughter with Nokuzola Ndamase(Zithulele's wife). 

Nokubonga Khuzwayo As Zakithi Bhengu, she is a very ambitious businesswoman,she worked at Maluju Oil where she tried several times to get rid of Ngcolosi as a CEO, before she join Shongololo Oil. She is a elder daughter of MaZulu and Ngcolosi, granddaughter of MaNdlovu, a Niece of Shongololo and KaMadonsela, a sister of Nkululeko, Nganono, Zithulele and Buhle, a cousin of Nokukhanya, Ntombifuthi and Thu Sheleni, aunt of Mepho and Nozimangaliso. She is a leader(Mafungwase) of the Bhengu family and she is very stubborn, a dictator and a proudly sing girl. 

Raphael Griffiths As Zithulele Bhengu. He is the founder and the CEO of Shongololo Oil, he worked in Maluju Oil under his father Ngcolosi and he left because he was tired of being under shadow of his father and he started his own Oil company Shongololo Oil which became the big competitor of Maluju Oil, he is a third son of Ngcolosi and a second son of MaZulu, grandson of MaNdlovu, a brother of Nkululeko, Nganono, Zakithi and Buhle, a cousin of Nokukhanya, Ntombifuthi and Thu Sheleni, a nephew of Shongololo and KaMadonsela, a uncle of Mepho and Nozimangaliso. 

Jailoshini Naidoo As Nirupa Rampersad, she is a Matriarch of Rampersad family, a widow of Pranav Rampersad, Mother of Shria and Mira and Thu Sheleni's aunt. She dated Maharaj while they were still at Varsity, She have been living with a secret that Shria is not Pranav's daughter but she is Maharaj's daughter. 

Kajal Maharaj As Shria Rampersad, she is an ambitious businesswoman, she works at Maluju Oil, she is Nirupa and Pranav's daughter but later found out that she is Maharaj's daughter,she dates Jason, a sister of Mira and Cousin of Thu Sheleni. Like Zakithi she would do anything to make sure that the Maluju Oil is in the perfect place, she have tried several times to take over as CEO from Ngcolosi. She and Pranav wanted to take Maluju Oil from the Bhengus but they fail, she accused Ngcolosi for the murder of Pranav. After it was discovered that she is Maharaj's daughter Mira started to hate Shria, believing that shria does not deserve to get inheritance of the Rampersads because she is Maharaj's daughter 

Jack Devnarai As Sunil Maharaj, is Businessman, mastermind criminal who always have dirty trick, he would do anything to get what he wants. He Kidnapped and almost killed Zithulele and Shria in different occasions. He was bombed and believed to be dead but he survived. While he was in jail Mira ask for his DNA to test if he is Shria's biological father but he wanted Mira to give him Shria's DNA. When he founds out that he is Shria's biological father he make a plan to get out of prison, he threatened a doctor to give him a medicine that will affect his kidneys so he will get a medical parole.

Cast

Awards and nominations

References

2018 South African television series debuts
2010s South African television series
South African drama television series